Alec Baldwin's filmography includes the year the film was/will be released, the name of his character and other related notes. There is also a list of his appearances on TV series, video games and documentaries, as well as stage. A member of the Baldwin family, he is the eldest of the four Baldwin brothers, all actors. Baldwin first gained recognition by appearing on the sixth and seventh  seasons of primetime CBS soap opera Knots Landing in the role of Joshua Rush, the half-brother of long-standing character Valene Ewing (Joan Van Ark). 

In his early career he then has played both leading and supporting roles in a variety of films such as Tim Burton's Beetlejuice (1988), Mike Nichols' Working Girl (1988), Jonathan Demme's Married to the Mob (1988), and Oliver Stone's Talk Radio (1988). He gained attention for his performances in Glengarry Glen Ross (1992), and as Jack Ryan in The Hunt for Red October (1990). Since then he has worked with such notable directors such as Woody Allen in Alice (1990), To Rome with Love (2012), and Blue Jasmine (2013), Spike Lee in BlacKkKlansman (2018), and Martin Scorsese in The Aviator (2004) and The Departed (2006). His performance in the 2003 drama The Cooler garnered him a nomination for the Academy Award for Best Supporting Actor.

From 2006 to 2013, Baldwin starred as Jack Donaghy on the critically acclaimed NBC sitcom 30 Rock starring alongside Tina Fey. He won many accolades for his performance winning two Primetime Emmy Awards, three Golden Globe Awards, and seven Screen Actors Guild Awards for his work on the show, making him the male performer with the most SAG Awards. 

Baldwin recently co-starred alongside Tom Cruise in Mission: Impossible – Rogue Nation and Mission: Impossible – Fallout, respectively the fifth and sixth installments of the Mission: Impossible series. He is also a columnist for The Huffington Post. Since 2016, he has been the host of Match Game. He has received worldwide attention and acclaim for his portrayal of Donald Trump on the long-running sketch series Saturday Night Live, both during the 2016 U.S. presidential election and following the inauguration, a role for which he won a Primetime Emmy in 2017.

Film

Television

Television events

Documentaries

Stage

Video games

References

External links
 

Male actor filmographies
American filmographies
Alec Baldwin filmography